Neocicindela tuberculata is a species of tiger beetle in the family Cicindelidae, endemic to New Zealand.  Its common names include common tiger beetle, moeone, and papapa, and in its laval stage penny doctor, butcher boy, kapuku, kui, kurikuri, moeone, and muremure. Neocicindela tuberculata was the first carabid beetle described from New Zealand. The species can run as fast as 5 miles per hour and are considered to be the fastest running beetles. Adult species prefer clay banks in summer and are good predators when in comes to insects.

N. tuberculata are found throughout New Zealand and can be seen on hot sunny days on clay tracks or sandy areas. As well as running it can also fly. The adult beetle is approximately 2.5 cm long, and is greenish in colour with yellow markings on the side of the elytra. It eats other insects as food.

Identification

Adults 
Tiger beetle genera are very similar in colour and because of this they can be hard to identify, with the main difference between species being in the proportions of their body parts. The adult Neocicindela tuberculata has long legs, much like other tiger beetles, and its tarsal claws are about half the length of tarsal segment 5. The beetle is about 9–12 mm in length with a dark brown head and pronotum. The elytra (wing coverings or hardened for wings) are dark brown with some tinges of velvet black and moderately wide, pale yellow markings on the outer sides of the elytra. The elytra also have dark areas and are “densely covered with minute green punctures”. The dark areas of the elytra are moderately shiny and have a lustre that is metallic and bronze or green in colour. The elytra also begin to widen behind the middle. They have dark antennae and femurs, but pale tibias and tarsi. The first antennal segment also has anywhere between five or nine setiferous pores.

Larvae 
The larvae look quite different to the adult in the fact that they are almost grub like. They have a 13-segmented abdomen that is slender and elongate. The larvae also has paired sub-apical cerci and prominent dorsal hooks on the 5th segment of the abdomen that are used to keep them in place in their burrow. The tarsi of the larvae also contains one or two claws. There are also lateral ocelli (eyes) on the larvae and these are constructed in such a way that they can scan a wide field of vision as well as look in different directions for prey. The labrum of the larvae is well developed and projects from the head of the insect. The larvae slowly widens after segment five and segment 9 will have a pronounced dorsal hump.

Life cycle/Phenology 
Mating for N. tuberculata occurs during February  and after this occurs the female lays her eggs in the soil by drilling many holes with her ovipositor, and laying one egg in each hole. These holes are initially big enough for the larvae, however as the larvae grow, so too must the hole. As they develop and grow in size, the larvae will make the hole bigger, therefore the size of the burrow will determine the age of the larvae. The larval stage depends on not only the species of Cicindela, but also the frequency of food, and the climate, however the larval stage will generally only last for one to two years depending on these resources. Once the larvae are ready to pupate they do so and this stage is very brief, beginning in February, which is when the larval population declines to a point where they are no longer seen. When it is pupating, the larvae plugs the hole of its burrow and descends to the bottom of the burrow where it digs a side cavity to pupate in. The adults will emerge in spring or early summer, where they will mate and die before autumn is finished.

Geographic Distribution and habitat

Natural global range 
There are two endemic genera of tiger Beetles in New Zealand and these are represented by 16 different species, of which Neoicindela tuberculata is one.

New Zealand range 
Neocicindela tuberculata is found across all regions of the North Island and is also found in the Marlborough and Tasman regions of the South Island. It is most often found on the lowland areas of these regions.

Habitat preferences 
N. tuberculata is found in most habitats  but generally prefers open areas. N. tuberculata is a diurnal (active in daylight/sunshine) insect so would be most benefited by areas with large amounts of sunlight. They are also generally found in physiological and ecologically uncomplicated areas. The larvae of N. tuberculata prefer to dig their burrows in on dry soil, particularly exposed sand or peaty soil  as well as clay banks.

Diet and foraging 
Both the adult and the larvae of Neocicindela tuberculata are predators of other insects. The adults of N. tuberculata eat mainly caterpillars and flies, and it has been said that the “mean mandible length (chord) is directly related to mean size of prey captures by tiger beetles throughout the world”. Food data and mouthpart morphology of the tiger Beetle genera, shows that they are opportunistic predators that can feed on a variety of small prey. The adults use their long legs, and therefore running capabilities, to catch their prey, along with their short flight capabilities. The larvae dig vertical burrows in the ground  which can be up to 15 cm deep  and are kept constantly clean and smooth by the larvae. Once the larvae have burrowed into their holes, they sit at the entrance in such a way that their head is at the entrance of the hole and their body fills the rest of their hole. Once the larvae spots prey they determine the best way to catch it based on its size, by either going back into their burrow and seizing it when it falls in, or by darting out and seizing the prey that way. The larvae generally feed on flies and other small invertebrates, similar to what the adult feeds on.

Predators, Parasites, and Diseases 
Neocicindela tuberculata is preyed on by a number of different birds such as kiwis and magpies. It is also preyed on by Asilids, better known as Assassin flies or Robber flies. To protect itself from these predators the adult emits a musky smell when it is disturbed. C. tuberculata is also part of the only beetle family (tiger beetles) that are capable of instantaneous flight and there is a possibility that they also use this to evade predators. The tiger beetle family are generally the fastest running beetles because of their long legs. This could also be used as a method of evasion from predators.

Other information 
Neocicindela tuberculata was the first carabid beetle to be described from New Zealand in 1775.

References

External links

Scientific literature discussing Neocicindela tuberculata in the Biodiversity Heritage Library
Citizen Science observations of Neocicindela tuberculata
Neocicindela tuberculata discussed in RNZ Critter of the Week, 10 Jul 2020

Cicindelidae
Beetles described in 1775
Beetles of New Zealand
Endemic fauna of New Zealand
Taxa named by Johan Christian Fabricius
Endemic insects of New Zealand